The named plateaus and mesas of Utah.

Carbon County
W
 West Tavaputs Plateau

Emery County
B
 Beckwith Plateau

Garfield County

A
 Aquarius Plateau
K
 Kaiparowits Plateau
M
 Markagunt Plateau

S
 Sevier Plateau
W
 Wildcat Mesa

Grand County
E
 East Tavaputs Plateau

Kane County
C
Checkerboard Mesa
Crazy Quilt Mesa
K
Kaiparowits Plateau

Iron County
M
 Markagunt Plateau

Piute County
S
 Sevier Plateau

San Juan County
C
 Cummings Mesa

W
 Wingate Mesa

Sanpete County
W
 Wasatch Plateau

Sevier County
O
 Old Woman Plateau
S
 Sevier Plateau

Uintah County
D
 Diamond Mountain Plateau
E
 East Tavaputs Plateau
Y
 Yampa Plateau

Washington County
H
 Hurricane Mesa
K
 Kolob Terrace
S
 Smith Mesa

Wayne County

A
 Awapa Plateau
S
 Sams Mesa
 South Caineville Mesa

T
 Thompson Mesa

See also
 List of mountain ranges of Utah
 List of rivers of Utah
 List of valleys of Utah

References
 DeLorme. Utah Atlas & Gazetteer, DeLorme, c. 2010, 64 pp.

 
Plateaus
Mesas of Utah